HMG-CoA reductase (3-hydroxy-3-methyl-glutaryl-coenzyme A reductase, official symbol HMGCR) is the rate-controlling enzyme (NADH-dependent, ; NADPH-dependent) of the mevalonate pathway, the metabolic pathway that produces cholesterol and other isoprenoids. HMGCR catalyzes the conversion of HMG-CoA to mevalonic acid, a necessary step in the biosynthesis of cholesterol. Normally in mammalian cells this enzyme is competitively suppressed so that its effect is controlled. This enzyme is the target of the widely available cholesterol-lowering drugs known collectively as the statins, which help treat dyslipidemia.

HMG-CoA reductase is anchored in the membrane of the endoplasmic reticulum, and was long regarded as having seven transmembrane domains, with the active site located in a long carboxyl terminal domain in the cytosol. More recent evidence shows it to contain eight transmembrane domains.

In humans, the gene for HMG-CoA reductase (NADPH) is located on the long arm of the fifth chromosome (5q13.3-14). Related enzymes having the same function are also present in other animals, plants and bacteria.

Structure 
The main isoform (isoform 1) of HMG-CoA reductase in humans is 888 amino acids long. It is a polytopic transmembrane protein (meaning it possesses many alpha helical transmembrane segments). It contains two main domains:
a conserved N-terminal sterol-sensing domain (SSD, amino acid interval: 88–218). The related SSD of SCAP has been shown to bind cholesterol.
a C-terminal catalytic domain (amino acid interval: 489-871), namely the 3-hydroxy-3-methyl-glutaryl-CoA reductase domain. This domain is required for the proper enzymatic activity of the protein.

Isoform 2 is 835 amino acids long. This variant is shorter because it lacks an exon in the middle region (amino acids 522–574). This does not affect any of the aforementioned domains.

Function 
HMGCR catalyses the conversion of HMG-CoA to mevalonic acid, a necessary step in the biosynthesis of cholesterol:

Normally in mammalian cells this enzyme is competitively suppressed by cholesterol derived from the internalization and degradation of low density lipoprotein (LDL) via the LDL receptor as well as oxidized species of cholesterol. Competitive inhibitors of the reductase induce the expression of LDL receptors in the liver, which in turn increases the catabolism of plasma LDL and lowers the plasma concentration of cholesterol, which is considered, by those who accept the standard lipid hypothesis, an important determinant of atherosclerosis. This enzyme is thus the target of the widely available cholesterol-lowering drugs known collectively as the statins (see Drugs section for more).

Interactive pathway map

Inhibitors

Drugs 
Drugs that inhibit HMG-CoA reductase, known collectively as HMG-CoA reductase inhibitors (or "statins"), are used to lower serum cholesterol as a means of reducing the risk for cardiovascular disease.

These drugs include rosuvastatin (CRESTOR), lovastatin (Mevacor), atorvastatin (Lipitor), pravastatin (Pravachol), fluvastatin (Lescol), pitavastatin (Livalo), and simvastatin (Zocor). Red yeast rice extract, one of the fungal sources from which the statins were discovered, contains several naturally occurring cholesterol-lowering molecules known as monacolins. The most active of these is monacolin K, or lovastatin (previously sold under the trade name Mevacor, and now available as generic lovastatin).

Vytorin is drug that combines the use simvastatin and ezetimibe, which slows the formation of cholesterol by every cell in the body, along with ezetimibe reducing absorption of cholesterol, typically by about 53%, from the intestines.

Statins, HMG-CoA reductase inhibitors, are competent in lowering cholesterol levels and reducing cardiac-related diseases. However, there have been controversies surrounding the potential of statins increasing the risk of new-onset diabetes mellitus (NOD). Experiments have demonstrated that glucose and cholesterol homeostasis are regulated by statins. The HMG-CoA reductase (HMGCR), converts HMG-CoA into mevalonic acid. Thus, when HMGCR activities are reduced, the cell associated cholesterols are also reduced. This results in the activation of SREBP-2-mediated signaling pathways. SREBP-2 activation for cholesterol homeostasis is crucial for the upregulation of low density lipoprotein (LDL) receptor (LDLR). The removal of LDL particles from blood circulation is enhanced when the number of LDLR on hepatocytes increases. Due to the removal of atherogenic lipoprotein particles, such as LDLs and intermediate density lipoproteins, HMGCR inhibitors have been proven to be efficient in reducing cardiovascular diseases from the blood circulation, which is represented by the reduction of LDL-cholesterol levels. In many studies, lipophilic statins are shown as more diabetogenic, possibly due to the fact that they can easily diffuse into cells and inhibit the production of isoprenoids which become more potent. Additionally, statins have been shown to change glucose levels as well.

Hormones 
HMG-CoA reductase is active when blood glucose is high. The basic functions of insulin and glucagon are to maintain glucose homeostasis. Thus, in controlling blood sugar levels, they indirectly affect the activity of HMG-CoA reductase, but a decrease in activity of the enzyme is caused by  AMP-activated protein kinase, which responds to an increase in AMP concentration, and also to leptin.

Clinical significance 
Since the reaction catalysed by HMG-CoA reductase is the rate-limiting step in cholesterol synthesis, this enzyme represents the sole major drug target for contemporary cholesterol-lowering drugs in humans. The medical significance of HMG-CoA reductase has continued to expand beyond its direct role in cholesterol synthesis following the discovery that statins can offer cardiovascular health benefits independent of cholesterol reduction. Statins have been shown to have anti-inflammatory properties, most likely as a result of their ability to limit production of key downstream isoprenoids that are required for portions of the inflammatory response. It can be noted that blocking of isoprenoid synthesis by statins has shown promise in treating a mouse model of multiple sclerosis, an inflammatory autoimmune disease.

Inhibition of HMG-CoA reductase by statins is lessened in patients with type 2 diabetes, which results in lessened inhibition of coronary atheromatous plaque, development.

HMG-CoA reductase is an important developmental enzyme. Inhibition of its activity and the concomitant lack of isoprenoids that yields can lead to germ cell migration defects as well as intracerebral hemorrhage.

Regulation 

Regulation of HMG-CoA reductase is achieved at several levels: transcription, translation, degradation and phosphorylation.

Transcription 
Transcription of the reductase gene is enhanced by the sterol regulatory element binding protein (SREBP). This protein binds to the sterol regulatory element (SRE), located on the 5' end of the reductase gene after controlled proteolytic processing. When SREBP is inactive, it is bound to the ER or nuclear membrane with another protein called SREBP cleavage-activating protein (SCAP). SCAP senses low cholesterol concentration and transports SREBP to the Golgi membrane where a consecutive proteolysis by S1P and S2P cleaves SREBP into an active nuclear form, nSREBP. nSREBPs migrate to the nucleus and activate transcription of SRE-containing genes. The nSREBP transcription factor is short-lived. When cholesterol levels rise, Insigs retains the SCAP-SREBP complex in the ER membrane by preventing its incorporation into COPII vesicles.

Translation 
Translation of mRNA is inhibited by a mevalonate derivative, which has been reported to be the isoprenoid farnesol, although this role has been disputed.

Degradation 
Rising levels of sterols increase the susceptibility of the reductase enzyme to ER-associated degradation (ERAD) and proteolysis. Helices 2-6 (total of 8) of the HMG-CoA reductase transmembrane domain are thought to sense increased cholesterol levels (direct sterol binding to the SSD of HMG-CoA reductase has not been demonstrated). Lysine residues 89 and 248 can become ubiquinated by ER-resident E3 ligases. The identity of the multiple E3 ligases involved in HMG-CoA degradation is controversial, with suggested candidates being AMFR, Trc8, and RNF145 The involvement of AMFR and Trc8 has been contested.

Phosphorylation 
Short-term regulation of HMG-CoA reductase is achieved by inhibition by phosphorylation (of Serine 872, in humans). Decades ago it was believed that a cascade of enzymes controls the activity of HMG-CoA reductase: an HMG-CoA reductase kinase was thought to inactivate the enzyme, and the kinase in turn was held to be activated via phosphorylation by HMG-CoA reductase kinase kinase. An excellent review on regulation of the mevalonate pathway by Nobel Laureates Joseph Goldstein and Michael Brown adds specifics: HMG-CoA reductase is phosphorylated and inactivated by an AMP-activated protein kinase, which also phosphorylates and inactivates acetyl-CoA carboxylase, the rate-limiting enzyme of fatty acid biosynthesis. Thus, both pathways utilizing acetyl-CoA for lipid synthesis are inactivated when energy charge is low in the cell, and concentrations of AMP rise. There has been a great deal of research on the identity of upstream kinases that phosphorylate and activate the AMP-activated protein kinase.

Fairly recently, LKB1 has been identified as a likely AMP kinase kinase, which appears to involve calcium/calmodulin signaling. This pathway likely transduces signals from leptin, adiponectin, and other signaling molecules.

See also 
 Oxidoreductase

References

Further reading

External links 
 Cholesterol Synthesis  - has some good regulatory details
  - the HMG-CoA Reductase Structure in Interactive 3D
 

EC 1.1.1